The North York Renegades are a junior ice hockey team based in Toronto, Ontario, Canada. They are members of the South Division of the Greater Metro Junior A Hockey League (GMHL). The Renegades were founded in 2014 and joined the GMHL to compete in the 2014–15 season. The club plays their home games at Canlan Ice Sports – York.

History
In June 2014, it was announced that the Renegades had been granted a franchise in the Greater Metro Junior A Hockey League (GMHL) for the 2014–15 season. The club was created by Allan Donnan and owned by TPA Sports and to play their home games out of York University's Canlan Ice Sports – York. The Renegades finished their debut regular season in last place overall and sixth in the South Division of the South Conference. All clubs advanced to the 2014–15 Russell Cup playoffs with the Renegades being drawn against the Cambridge Bears in Round One of the sudden death Elimination Qualifiers. The Renegades were defeated 2–3, ending their playoff run.

After the end of their first season, the team was sold by TPA Sports to Joey Gagne of Abrams Towing. In August 2015, it was announced that the Renegades had hired Ryan Ramsay has the new head coach, replacing Brad Davenport. Prior to the start of the 2015–16 season the GMHL realigned the teams into three divisions, North, Central and South, and dropped the two conferences for the season. The Renegades were placed into the eleven team South Division.

Season by season results

Head coaches
Brad Davenport, 2014–15
Ryan Ramsay, 2015–2018
Darryl Lloyd, 2018–present

References

External links
Official website

2014 establishments in Ontario
Ice hockey clubs established in 2014
Ice hockey teams in Ontario